Svay Antor (Khmer: ស្រុកស្វាយអន្ទរ), previously Prey Veng, is a district located in Prey Veng province.
, there are 11 communes (Khmer: Khum ឃុំ):
 Angkor Tret
 Chea Khlang
 Chrey
 Damrey Puon
 Mebon
 Pean Rong
 Po Puos
 Prey Khla
 Samrong
 Svay Antor
 Teuk Thla

References

Districts of Prey Veng province